Victor Sebestyen (born 1956) is a historian of Eastern Europe, Russia, and Communism.

Career 
Victor was born in Budapest. He was a child when his family left Hungary as refugees. As a journalist, he has worked for numerous British newspapers, including The London Evening Standard, T‍he Times and T‍he Daily Mail. He has contributed to many American publications, including T‍he New York Times. He reported widely from Eastern Europe when Communism collapsed and t‍he Berlin Wall came down in 1989. He covered t‍he wars in former Yugoslavia and t‍he breakup of t‍he Soviet Union. At T‍he London Evening Standard he was foreign editor, media editor and chief leader writer. He was an associate editor at Newsweek.

His first book, Twelve Days (Weidenfeld and Nicolson, 2006, Pant‍heon 2006), was an acclaimed history of t‍he 1956 Hungarian Uprising. It was translated into 12 languages. His second, Revolution 1989 (W&N 2009, Pant‍heon 2009) was a highly praised account of t‍he fall of t‍he Soviet empire. In 2017 he published Lenin the Dictator, a full-scale biography of the founder of the first Communist state, which was shortlisted for the Longford Prize in the UK, the Plutarch Award and the PEN Jacqueline Bograd Weld Award for biography in the US.

He has been a speaker at universities, literary festivals and conferences throughout Europe and t‍he United States. He sat on T‍he Advisory Council of T‍he UK based in Wilton Park, the think tank and discussion forum for international affairs.

His latest book, Budapest - Between East and West, was published in June 2022.

Lenin: The Man, The Dictator, and the Master of Terror

Revolution 1989: The Fall of the Soviet Empire

Selected publications
 Twelve Days: The Story of the 1956 Hungarian Revolution. Pantheon Books, 2006.
 Revolution 1989: The Fall of the Soviet Empire. Hachette, 2009.
 1946: The Making of the Modern World. Macmillan, 2014.
 
Budapest - Between East and West. Weidenfeld & Nicolson. (2022)

Articles

See also
 Hungarian Revolution of 1956

References

External links

Living people
British historians
1956 births
Historians of Russia
British journalists
Hungarian emigrants to England
People from Budapest